This is a list of candidates in 2013 Iranian presidential election which was held on 14 June 2013. This list includes candidates who announced, withdrew, declined or were disqualified their nomination for the election.

List
The candidates are listed in below in four groups (conservatives, reformists and independents). More than 40 people registered for the election.

 * Registrations took place from 7 to 11 May 2013.
 **Mottaki left the party on 10 May 2013.

Alliances

Principlists

Cabinet Alliance
Mahmoud Ahmadinejad stated he will not endorse anyone or interfere in the election to choose his successor, however he announced he will support Esfandiar Rahim Mashaei if he will be confirmed, two other cabinet members, Mohammad-Reza Rahimi and Sadeq Khalilian are also registered without the support of Ahmadinejad:

 Esfandiar Rahim Mashaei
 Mohammad-Reza Rahimi
 Sadeq Khalilian
 Gholam-Hossein Elham
 Mojtaba Samareh Hashemi
 Ali Nikzad
 Hamid Baqai
 Hamid-Reza Haji Babaee

Progression Alliance
The following three candidates also known as 2+1 formed a coalition between themselves that one of the three will register for the election and the remaining two will support him, however all of those registered and the main candidate will be announced in a later which it is possible that all will be enter to the elections. This coalition consist of: 
 Ali Akbar Velayati
 Mohammad Bagher Ghalibaf
 Gholamali Haddad-Adel

Front of Islamic Revolution Stability
This political group was founded by former Ahmadinejad ministers and supporters who believe in his election message but they are not supporting his actions anymore. For the following election, their main candidates are among Kamran Bagheri Lankarani, Saeed Jalili and Parviz Fattah. Kamran Bagheri Lankarani was elected as their candidate on 20 April 2013.
 Kamran Bagheri Lankarani
 Parviz Fattah

Conservatives Majority Alliance
The following announced candidates will also chose one with most popularity to officially register for the election. On May 9 after selection of Aboutorabi Fard was announced, Mottaki declared he will not accept this selection and will run separately:
 Mohammad-Hassan Aboutorabi Fard
 Manouchehr Mottaki
 Mohammad Reza Bahonar
 Yahya Ale Eshaq
 Mostafa Pourmohammadi

United Front of Conservatives
The main candidate was elected by a majority vote of the congress on 10 May 2013:
 Alireza Zakani
 Ali Larijani

Combatant Clergy Association
Despite being associated with the CCA, Hassan Rouhani was not supported by the party as he progressed in the election. The party eventually had no candidate that they directly supported.
 Mohammad-Hassan Aboutorabi Fard
 Mostafa Pourmohammadi

Reformists

Moderation and Development Party
Hassan Rouhani announced his registration after his mentor Akbar Hashemi Rafsanjani was disqualified. Rouhani had gained heavy reformist support throughout his election campaign, with himself being a centrist moderate with ties to the conservative faction.

Democracy Party
On 15 January 2013, Democracy party elected their party leader, Mostafa Kavakebian as their sole candidate for the upcoming election. Kavakebian also said that he will withdraw if Mohammad Khatami announced his candidacy.

House of Labours
The party elected Hossein Kamali as their candidate on 22 November 2012 but Kamali withdrew on 11 May 2013. The supporting candidate will be elected on 25 May 2013.

Executives of Construction Party
After Mohammad-Ali Najafi announced he will not register for the election, the party announced their support for Hassan Rouhani after their candidate Akbar Hashemi Rafsanjani was disqualified:
 Akbar Hashemi Rafsanjani
Mohammad-Ali Najafi
 Eshaq Jahangiri
 Bijan Namdar Zangeneh

Association of Combatant Clerics
Mohammad Khatami was considered to be a very popular frontrunner with a lot of support in the election, but he was eventually disqualified, the party then announced their support for Hassan Rouhani:
 Mohammad Khatami
 Mostafa Mohaghegh Damad

Islamic Iran Participation Front
Mohammad-Reza Aref eventually became the sole reformist in the final confirmed group of candidates in the election. He withdrew on the advice of Mohammad Khatami so the vote would not be split between Aref and Hassan Rouhani, Aref upon withdrawing immediately announced his support for Rouhani.
 Mohammad-Reza Aref
 Mohsen Mehralizadeh

See also
Iranian presidential election, 2013
List of candidates in the Iranian presidential election, 2017

References

External links
 Ministry of Interior

Candidates for President of Iran
2013 Iranian presidential election